The NATO H band is the obsolete designation given to the radio frequencies from 6 000 to 8 000 MHz (equivalent to wavelengths between 5 and  3.75 cm) during the cold war period. Since 1992 frequency allocations, allotment and assignments are in line to NATO Joint Civil/Military Frequency Agreement (NJFA).
However, in order to identify military radio spectrum requirements, e.g. for crises management planning, training, Electronic warfare activities, or in military operations, this system is still in use.

References 

Radio spectrum
 
Microwave bands